The McLaren Group is a British holding company based in Woking, England, which is involved in Formula One and other motorsport and the manufacture of luxury cars.

The group was founded by Ron Dennis shortly after his acquisition of the McLaren Formula One team in 1981, as the TAG McLaren Group due to a partnership with Mansour Ojjeh's TAG Group. The Formula One team had been established by New Zealander Bruce McLaren in 1963.

McLaren Group was renamed McLaren Technology Group in 2015.  In June 2017 it was announced that Dennis had sold his 25% shareholding in the company to the other shareholders, in addition to his shares in McLaren Automotive. The group then merged with McLaren Automotive to form a new company using the previous McLaren Group name.

History
Bruce McLaren started Bruce McLaren Motor Racing in 1963 and the team first entered Formula One in 1966. Teddy Mayer took over direction of the group following McLaren's death while testing a Can-am series car in 1970. Mayer subsequently led McLaren to their first World Constructors' Championship in 1974 with Brazilian driver Emerson Fittipaldi, who also won the World Drivers' Championship that year.

McLaren Group and all of its companies were later formed by Ron Dennis CBE. These include a diverse number of technology based companies including TAGMcLaren Audio, a high end manufacturer of DVD players and audio equipment (later sold to International Audio Group), Absolute Taste, a London-based catering company notable for numerous celebrities including John Terry and Jenson Button, McLaren Automotive, a high-end luxury sports car manufacturer, Lydden Circuit, a Kent racing circuit and McLaren Applied Technologies- known for its sporting equipment used by Mark Cavendish, Lizzie Yarnold, and others in numerous sports including bicycles and skeletons. McLaren Composites, creators of composites for cars such as the McLaren F1 and Mercedes SLR and even spacecraft parts, was later replaced by McLaren Applied Technologies. The group consists of a large number of companies (and subsidiaries of its companies), some of which are stated below.

Between 1998 and 2011 McLaren built both the McLaren Technology Centre, a new headquarters and factory for the Group, and the McLaren Production Centre, in Woking, England.

In late May 2020, McLaren Group announced the layoff of 25% of its workforce as part of a company restructure due to the COVID-19 pandemic.

In April 2021, Global Net Lease announced that it had agreed to acquire the McLaren Technology Centre in Woking for £170 million.

The group sold McLaren Applied to Greybull Capital in August 2021.

Subsidiaries

McLaren Racing

McLaren originally entered Formula One in 1966 under its founder Bruce McLaren. However, in 1970 he died in a crash. The team was saved by Teddy Mayer, who helped the team win their first Constructors and Drivers titles. After Mayer, Ron Dennis took over the McLaren Racing team and worked for the company until 2018. However, at the beginning of the 2009 season, Dennis handed over the F1 department to Martin Whitmarsh so Dennis could focus on expanding McLaren overall, and especially in the road car market.

In 1966, McLaren suffered with reliability with their Ford 4.2-litre engine, and only scored one point after changing to a Serenissima V8. In 1967 they tried two different BRM engines. For the 1968 season they switched to Cosworth Ford engines. These continued to 1983, apart from a couple of Alfa Romeo examples, and then the TAG-Porsche turbo came in. This was the start of the MP4 cars, and the first entire carbon-composite chassis.

Honda engines took over in 1988, and then in 1993 the MP4/8 had a Ford HB engine. The next year was a Peugeot V10, and then the Mercedes era began in 1995, ending after the 2014 season.

The team's first F1 race win occurred in 1968 when Bruce McLaren won the non-championship Race of Champions at Brands Hatch driving a McLaren M7A Ford. Later that year the team scored its first Grand Prix win when Bruce McLaren took the Belgian Grand Prix at Spa Francorchamps. By the end of the season Denny Hulme had won two further Grands Prix—in Italy and Canada (the team's first 1-2 finish in a World Championship race). Emerson Fittipaldi won the F1 world championship in 1974, and McLaren also took their first constructor's title at the same time. The 1976 title was taken by James Hunt, and then there was a gap until 1984. Then, Lauda took the title, and Prost took it the next two years running. The team took the constructor's title in 1984 and 1985.

In 1988, the McLaren MP4/4 had a very successful year. Not only did Senna win the title, but the car won 15 out of 16 races, and, apart from just 27 laps, led every single lap during the year. Prost won in 1989, and then left for Ferrari after clashing with Senna. Senna also won the title for McLaren in 1990 and 1991.

The partnership between McLaren and Mercedes began in 1995 with McLaren choosing to use Mercedes engines. McLaren and Mercedes announced their intention to part ways in November 2009 as Mercedes had bought the debut-season driver and constructor winning team Brawn. It was re-branded as Mercedes Grand Prix. Ron Dennis said one reason McLaren and Mercedes parted ways was because of his "ambitious plans to turn McLaren into a car manufacturer." Dennis insisted that in the "21st century to survive in F1 you need to have more than just a team". However Mercedes continued to supply engines to McLaren until 2014.

Vodafone's title sponsorship deal, which began in 2007, ended at the finish of the 2013 season. In 2014, the team's official title was McLaren Mercedes. In 2015, the team, under a new partnership with car manufacturer Honda changed its official title to McLaren Honda. In 2018, the team was powered by Renault, becoming McLaren-Renault until 2020, when the team switched from Renault to Mercedes.

McLaren Automotive

In 1992 McLaren began producing its first road car, the McLaren F1, which had many similarities to its F1 car. In total, 106 were produced from 1992 to 1998, and even though it has been out of production for 22 years, it remains the fastest naturally aspirated supercar ever. There are still few production cars with a higher top speed. Among those that are faster are the Koenigsegg Agera R, Bugatti Veyron, SSC Ultimate Aero, Bugatti Veyron Super Sport and the Koenigsegg One:1. In September 2009 McLaren announced the successor of the McLaren F1 was to be the upcoming McLaren P1. Dennis said that parting ways with Mercedes was a "win-win situation for both sides". McLaren also produced the Mercedes-Benz SLR McLaren with Mercedes as a joint project.

Former subsidiaries
Former subsidiaries of McLaren Group are:

Ownership
Ron Dennis initially owned all of McLaren after buying out the remaining original shareholders after Bruce McLaren's death. In 1983 he offered Mansour Ojjeh the chance to purchase 50% of the team, with McLaren becoming a joint venture with Ojjeh's TAG Group. In 2000, after supplying engines to the team through its Mercedes subsidiary for five years, Daimler AG exercised an option to buy 40% of the TAG McLaren Group. Dennis and Ojjeh each retained a 30% share.

In August 2006 it was reported that Daimler was considering acquiring the remaining 60% of the McLaren Group. However, it was announced in January 2007 that the Mumtalakat Holding Company had purchased 15% each from both Dennis and Ojjeh. In November 2009, Mercedes bought Brawn GP (renaming it Mercedes GP) and announced that McLaren would buy back Daimler's 40% share of the group over a period of two years. The shares were divided evenly between the remaining shareholders, with the Mumtalakat Holding Company owning 50% and Dennis and Ojjeh each owning 25%.

Dennis had stepped down as CEO of McLaren in 2009, handing over the reigns to Martin Whitmarsh, but returned to his post in 2014 under the condition that he would seek investment to take a controlling interest in the company. His attempts to do so ultimately failed, and in November 2016 he lost a court case against his fellow shareholders that saw him suspended from his position as chairman. Dennis' contract with McLaren expired in January 2017, and in June 2017 it was announced that he had agreed to sell his remaining shares in both the McLaren Technology Group and McLaren Automotive. McLaren Automotive then became a subsidiary of the McLaren Technology Group, merging the shareholding of the two companies and seeing the group revert to its original McLaren Group name.

In May 2018 it was announced that Canadian businessman Michael Latifi had purchased approximately 10% of the group with an investment of £200 million. This leaves the current shareholding at: Mumtalakat Holding Company 56.4%, TAG Group Limited 14.32%, Nidala (BVI) Limited (Michael Latifi) 9.84%, Favorita Limited 5.78%, Perlman Investments Limited 5.77%, McKal Holdings Ltd 5.24%, Acanitt Limited 2.65%.

References

 
Automotive companies established in 1985
Automotive companies of England
British companies established in 1985
Companies based in Surrey
Conglomerate companies established in 1985
Conglomerate companies of the United Kingdom
Holding companies established in 1985
Holding companies of the United Kingdom
Privately held companies of England